Adlington is a village and civil parish in Lancashire, England, near the West Pennine Moors and approximately three miles south of Chorley. It became a separate parish in 1842 then grew into a township around the textile and coal mining industries until these closed in the 1960s. It had a population of 5,270 at the 2001 census, but in the last decade this has risen by over 2,000 more people to 7,326. The measured population at the 2011 Census was 6,010. The Leeds and Liverpool Canal runs through the village and is host to White Bear Marina which is the largest marina on the Leeds and Liverpool Canal.

History

Toponymy
The last element 'ington' indicates that Adlington was an Anglo-Saxon settlement from about A.D. 650, while the first element is either a personal name, Eadwulf, or the aetheling or prince. Recorded spellings include, in 1190 Edeluinton, in 1202 Adelventon, in 1246 Adelinton and, in 1288 Adlington.

Manor
Adlington was part of the Penwortham barony granted to Randle de Marsey and later held by the Ferrers. In 1184 Hugh Gogard granted land to Cockersand Abbey. In 1202 Walter de Adlington granted six oxgangs of land to Siward de Duxbury. In 1230 Roger de Maresheya sold the township to the Earl of Chester. In 1288 Hugh de Adlington and Adam de Duxbury each held a moiety of the manor of William de Ferrers. The Duxbury portion was sold early in the 14th century and subdivided; several local families holding fractions. Land belonging to the St. Nicholas chantry in Standish Church was acquired by William Heaton, who died in 1619. John Pilkington, who had taken up arms for the king, but later took the side of Parliament in the civil war, had his estate sequestered.

In 1307 John Adlington paid rent to Sir Gilbert Standish. In 1374 Robert le Norreys of Burton quitclaimed his share to Hugh of Standish. In 1378 Sir Nicholas de Harrington held land subsequently held by Lord Ferrers of Groby and Thomas Harrington. There was a partition as some land was held of Lord Mounteagle, the Harringtons' successor.

In 1469 Hugh de Adlington gave the manor to his son, Robert who conveyed it to John Tarleton and Hugh Culcheth. Adlington fell in and out of the Adlington family ownership for over five centuries. Hugh Adlington died in 1525 holding messuages of Lord Mounteagle. His son Hugh died in 1556 holding the same estate which he left to his son John. Hugh Adlington died in 1640 holding the manor of Lord Morley and Mounteagle. His son Hugh was predeceased by his eldest son, John, who was killed fighting for the king at the Siege of Chester in 1644. Hugh was succeeded by Peter who had no surviving children and the manor descended to John's daughter Eleanor, who married Samuel Robinson of Chester in 1664.

Before 1700 the manor was bought by Thomas Clayton, who died in 1722. The estate descended to his grandson Richard Clayton and in 1770, to his nephew, Sir Richard, who was created a baronet in 1774 and built Adlington Hall in 1771. Richard, consul at Nantes, died in 1828 and was succeeded by his daughter Henrietta, wife of General Robert Browne, who assumed the Clayton name. Their son, Richard Clayton Browne Clayton, died in November 1886. His only son died at Sevastopol and Adlington Hall passed to James Robert Browne Clayton Dawbeny. Wigan council bought the 129-acre estate in 1921 to safeguard the town's water supply.

Adlington Hall, built on rising ground in 1771 by Sir Richard Clayton, was a Georgian mansion of brick and stone, and replaced an ancient timber and plaster house on the same site. It was demolished in the 1960s.

Industrial Revolution
Coal was mined in the area for centuries, first outcrops of coal and bell pits and then deeper shafts to the Arley mine (seam) at 137 feet. The Adlington Coal Company sank Ellerbeck Colliery in 1876. The company went bankrupt in 1932. The mine was run privately during the 1930s and in 1947 was nationalised. As part of the National Coal Board in 1958, Ellerbeck Colliery employed 411 men and women who worked as pit brow lasses, it closed in 1965. In the late 1970s and early '80s Ellerbeck was open cast and has been landscaped.

In 1891 Davies and Eckersley operated the Huyton Bleachworks and the Pin Croft Dyeing and Printing Company were bleachers and finishers. The largest mill was Adlington Mill, Thomas Gerrard and Sons spinning and weaving mill, which had 43,000 spindles and 900 looms. Springfield Mill operated by Thomas Middeton & Company had 700 looms and Unsworth's Brook Mill had 2,700 spindles and 96 looms.

Governance

In the Middle Ages Adlington was a township in the ecclesiastical parish of Standish in the Leyland Hundred of Lancashire. In 1837, Adlington joined with other townships (or civil parishes) in the area to form the Chorley Poor Law Union which took responsibility for the administration and funding of the Poor Law in that area. A local board was formed in 1872 was replaced by an urban district council of twelve members in 1894.

The town forms part of Chorley Borough which has headquarters at the town hall in Chorley. The town is represented on the council by three Labour Party councillors elected for the Adlington and Anderton ward.
Adlington is part of the Chorley parliamentary constituency, which elected Lindsay Hoyle as Member of Parliament for the Labour party at the 2010 General Election.

Geography
Adlington lies towards the north-east of the township; its area is 1,064 acres. Its south-east boundary is the River Douglas and Buckow Brook separates the township from Worthington to the west. The Ellerbeck is the boundary with Duxbury.

Economy
Adlington's economy was based on cotton mills and coal pits but the majority of these traditional industries have disappeared and the town primarily serves as a residential settlement for commuters working in Manchester, Bolton, Wigan and Chorley. Construction company Leonard Fairclough & Son was founded and based in the town before becoming part of the bigger AMEC group.

Transport

Adlington's main road is the A6 from Manchester via Blackrod to Chorley and Preston. It has a junction with the B6227 towards Rivington. The M61 motorway passes the eastern fringe of the town.

Adlington railway station is on the Manchester to Preston Line. Another station, White Bear railway station in Station Road, was on the Lancashire Union Railway between Wigan and Blackburn. It closed in 1960 (the line remained in use for goods until 1974) with the ticket office remaining as a local café. Evidence can be found throughout Adlington of the town's lost line.

The Leeds and Liverpool Canal passes through Adlington where the White Bear Marina is the largest marina on the canal.

Religion
The town has three active churches; St. Paul's, which is the Church of England parish church, St. Joseph's a Roman Catholic church and the United Reformed and Methodist church on Railway Road.

Christ Church was built in 1839 but was used as a chapel of ease after St. Paul's Church was built in 1884, but is no longer used for worship and has been converted to a restaurant. In the past there was an iron mission church dedicated to St Philip and there were Wesleyan, Primitive Methodist and Congregational churches.

Sports and recreation

Adlington has two large recreational areas, the King George's Field in the centre of the town and the Lower Playing Fields adjacent to the canal in lower Adlington. The King George's Field plays host to the town's amateur rugby league club Adlington Rangers and the town's football pub teams. Adlington also has a junior football club with a variety of age groups including an open age team. Meadow Road is home to Adlington Cricket Club which plays in the local Lancashire and Bolton leagues.

Notable people
Construction magnate Leonard Fairclough was born and lived in Adlington and has a memorial garden dedicated to him in the town. Sir Lindsay Hoyle, Speaker of the House of Commons,  was born and raised in the town. John Christopher Bradshaw, a New Zealand organist and university professor, was born in Adlington.

See also
Listed buildings in Adlington, Lancashire

References

Bibliography

External links
Adlington Town Council
Adlington Local government

 
Towns in Lancashire
Civil parishes in Lancashire
Geography of Chorley